Mapun, officially the Municipality of Mapun,  is a 4th class municipality in the province of Tawi-Tawi, Philippines. According to the 2020 census, it has a population of 30,038 people.

It is formerly known as Cagayan de Sulu until 1984, then as Cagayan de Tawi-Tawi until 1988.

Mapun is an island municipality in the Sulu Sea on the south-western extreme of the Philippines, located very close to Sabah, Malaysia as well as to Palawan. The people inhabiting the island are known as Jama Mapun or "people of Mapun". Their local language is Pullun Mapun, which means "Mapun language".

Due to an administrative error in the Treaty of Paris, while the remainder of the Philippines was ceded to the United States, Sibutu and Cagayan de Sulu were retained under Spanish Sovereignty until they were formally ceded to the United States upon the ratification of the Treaty of Washington on March 23, 1901.

Geography
Mapun Tawi-Tawi is surrounded by several islets such as:
Manda 
Boan
Kinapusan
Pamilikan
Lapun-Lapun
Bintuut
Muligi

Most of these are located at Barangay Umus Mataha.

Barangays
Mapun is politically subdivided into 15 barangays.

Climate

Demographics

Education

Elementary

Secondary
 Notre Dame of Cagayan (NDC) - a private school located in the border of Barangay Lupa Pula and Barangay Mahalu.
 Mindanao State University (MSU) - a public school located in Mahalu
 Tawi-Tawi Academy (TTA) - a private school located in Barangay Guppah
Mapun SHS

Tertiary

Mindanao State University Extension - a public school and the only college institution in Mapun. MSU-Extension offers two-year courses.

Majority of those who graduate from high school pursue their studies in other places, most notably Zamboanga City, Palawan, and Bongao.
On the other hand, most of the graduates from elementary and high school are forced to stop their studies due to poverty lack of scholarships from the government.
Most of them have found a job in neighboring country like Malaysia. Tend to work as a construction workers and fisherman.

Culture

Mapun Day
Mapun Foundation Day is celebrated by the Jama Mapun every September 5. This week-long celebration starts on September 1, with a parade and then a short program held in Lupa Pula Central School. Various competitions are held during Mapun Day, which includes singing competitions (in English, Tausug, and Pullun Mapun), dance showdowns (modern dance, folk dance, pangalay, which is a native dance, and lunsay, which is a dance performed during weddings), Azaan competition, Tarasul iban Daman (Mapun's version of declamation and oration), and Leleng, to name a few. Each Barangay has their own representatives in the various events. However, the most popular is the "Budjang Mapun", which is a beauty contest. Each barangay has its own contestant in this event. The winner of the search for "Budjang Mapun" is usually sent to Bongao as Mapun's representative in Budjang Tawi-Tawi, a similar beauty search held in Bongao every Province Day. Every municipality in Tawi-Tawi has its own contestant.

Economy 

Main source of income from this province are farming and fishing. 
In a bid to advance competitiveness of Tawi-Tawi in farming industry, this province supplies large companies when it comes on coconut plantation mainly "COPRA". 80% of the land consist of coconut trees, quarterly harvested and to be traded and refined in other places, like Palawan and Zamboanga City.

Rice fields are not known in this area due to lack of water irrigation projects, rice is imported locally from Palawan and Zamboanga City and mostly from Malaysia. Most of the locals use cassava as base on their daily meal.

See also
List of renamed cities and municipalities in the Philippines

References

External links
[ Philippine Standard Geographic Code]
Philippine Census Information
Mapun Profile at the DTI Cities and Municipalities Competitive Index

Islands of Tawi-Tawi
Landforms of the Sulu Sea
Municipalities of Tawi-Tawi
Island municipalities in the Philippines